The San Diego Trust and Savings Bank Building is an historic building in San Diego, in the U.S. state of California. It was listed on the National Register of Historic Places in 1999.

In 1926, architect William Templeton Johnson was commissioned to design the building, and construction began in 1927. The building opened to the public on April 14, 1928. The bank vacated the site on March 18, 1994, and in 1999 the building reopened as a Courtyard by Marriott hotel.

See also
 National Register of Historic Places listings in San Diego County, California

References

External links
 

1928 establishments in California
Buildings and structures completed in 1928
Buildings and structures in San Diego
Commercial buildings on the National Register of Historic Places in California
National Register of Historic Places in San Diego County, California